Mandakolathur Patanjali Sastri (4 January 1889 – 16 March 1963) was the second Chief Justice of India, serving in the post from 7 November 1951 to 3 January 1954.

Early life
He was the son of Pandit Krishna Sastri, senior Sanskrit pandit of Pachaiyappa's College, Madras. He graduated in B.A. from Madras University in around 1910 before taking an LL.B in 1912 and becoming an advocate.

Career
Sastri began his career as an advocate in the Madras High Court in 1914 and practised for some time, gaining repute as having special expertise in tax law, particularly with Chettiar clients. In 1922, he was appointed standing counsel to the Commissioner of Income Tax in recognition of his abilities in this field; he held the position until his elevation to the Bench on 15 March 1939. During this time, he, along with Sir Sidney Wadsworth notably tried complicated cases that followed after the passing of the Madras Agriculturists Debt Relief Act. He replaced his close friend Sir Srinivasa Varadachariar, who had been appointed to the Federal Court of India.

On 6 December 1947, by then third in seniority at the Madras High Court, he was made a judge of the Federal Court, which subsequently became the Supreme Court. Following the unexpected death of the Chief Justice, Sir Harilal Kania, on 6 November 1951, Sastri, as the senior-most associate justice, was appointed as Chief Justice. Sastri served in the position till he reached retirement age on 3 January 1954.

Previously appointed pro-chancellor of Delhi University in 1953, he served in that capacity until 1956. In retirement, Sastri remained active with the Delhi branch of the International Law Association and headed the Airlines Compensation Commission which oversaw the nationalisation of India's airlines. He also served as a member of the board of directors of the Press Trust of India and served on the Madras Legislative Council from July 1958 to April 1962. An eminent Sanskrit scholar and active member of the executive council of Benares Hindu University at the time of his death on 16 March 1963, he had chaired the Central Sanskrit Board since 1959, as well as the Kendriya Sanskrit Vidya Pith at Tirupati. He died at his son-in-law's residence in Delhi from a cardiac arrest. His great grandsons are Avanidhar Subrahmanyam, a Distinguished Professor at the University of California, Los Angeles, and Dr. Mandakulutur Subramanya Ganesh, Head of Oncology, Vydehi Institute of Medical Sciences, Bengaluru.

References 

1889 births
1963 deaths
University of Madras alumni
Chief justices of India
People from Tiruvannamalai district
20th-century Indian lawyers
20th-century Indian judges